"At the Beginning" is a song by Donna Lewis and Richard Marx, released as the first single from the Anastasia soundtrack. It was released as a CD and cassette single on October 21, 1997, on Atlantic Records.

The song reached No. 45 on the Hot 100 giving Lewis her third Hot 100 hit and Marx his 17th.  To date, neither has hit the Hot 100 since "At the Beginning" dropped out.  It reached No. 2 on Billboard's Adult Contemporary Chart, but did spend a week at No. 1 on Radio & Records' Adult Contemporary Chart before being knocked out by Celine Dion's "My Heart Will Go On".

The song gave Marx his eighth and most recent number one hit single as a singer. Lewis would not have any further songs that hit any chart.

Composition
The song is a moderate pop ballad.

Critical reception
Filmtracks noted that in addition the two pop reprises of songs features in the credits, "The unique entry is the tolerable "At the Beginning," which seems to have been meant to be the centrepiece of the pop songs but was overshadowed in popularity by the cast song adaptations." The site added "For soundtrack collectors, the song "At the Beginning" is interesting in that it included contributions by two composers still on the rise, including piano performances by Anne Dudley and string arrangements by Aaron Zigman, for whom it would be another ten years before his name would be widely known. "

Allmusic notes the film "duplicates the Disney formula of balancing big show tunes from the film with re-recorded MOR pop versions of the same song"; despite this being an original song the genre is still MOR pop. Film Score Monthly said "only the Richard Marx-Donna Lewis pairing "At the Beginning" holds any interest (it's the only original song not performed in the film)". TimeOut described it as "uplifting".

Billboard wrote "the romantic At The Beginning solidly ushers in the soundtrack to Anastasia, with Lewis and Marx proving to be a surprisingly chemical pair. Her waifish voice gracefully flutters around his rock edged grit, while producer Trevor Horn provides a reliably grand and dramatic musical environment. Although this oh-so-charming recording deserves widespread pop play, it will likely begin its radio life at AC, where programmers are often quicker to appreciate such a lushly arranged power ballad".

Music video
A music video for the song features a girl (a live-action version of Anastasia) visiting an old building. Throughout the video, Marx and Lewis are shown performing the song, intercut with scenes from Anastasia. The music video was also added on to some VHS copies of the film.

Track listing

 At the Beginning (Album Version)
 At the Beginning (Instrumental)
 At the Beginning (Remix)

Personnel 

 Richard Marx – lead vocals, arrangements
 Donna Lewis – guest vocals
 Anne Dudley – piano
 Tim Weidner – keyboards, programmer
 Henry Jackman – keyboards, programmer, strings arrangement
 Tim Pierce – electric guitar
 Randy Jackson – bass
 Niki Harris, Marlena Jeter, Jim Gilstrap and Darryl Phinnessee – backing vocals
 Aaron Zigman – strings arrangement

Production 

 Trevor Horn – production

Charts

Weekly charts

Year-end charts

References

Songs from Anastasia (1997 film)
1997 singles
Richard Marx songs
Donna Lewis songs
Song recordings produced by Trevor Horn
Songs written by Lynn Ahrens
Songs written by Stephen Flaherty
1997 songs
Atlantic Records singles
Pop ballads
1990s ballads
Cultural depictions of Grand Duchess Anastasia Nikolaevna of Russia
Love themes
Male–female vocal duets